The volleyball (Spanish:Voleibol) tournaments for the 2005 Bolivarian Games was held from August 13 to 18, 2005 at the Mayor Coliseum in Pereira, Colombia.

Participating teams

Medal table
Key:

Medalists

References

2005 in volleyball
Volleyball at the Bolivarian Games
International volleyball competitions hosted by Colombia
2005 Bolivarian Games